Mirza Kalich Baig was a scholar within Sindhi literature. He was born on 4 October 1853 in Tando Thoro on the bank of Phuleli Canal in Hyderabad, British India (presently in Pakistan).

Family chronicle
The lives of the Mirza family and their Georgian connections are a subject of the 2005 book A Georgian Saga: From the Caucasus to the Indus by family's scion Meherafroze Mirza Habib, Vice-President of All Pakistan Women's Association.

Books 
He wrote 457 books in 43 disciplines, "including chemistry, physics, biology, zoology, plant sciences, Sindhi literature and anthropology", and in over eight languages, including Sindhi, Persian, Arabic, English, while he knew 25 languages as a whole.

Mirza Kalich's books include:

 Maqalat-ul-Hikmat *
 Khoodyari
 Alamat-ul-Quran (Signs of Quran)
 Bagh ae Bayani
 Hashrat-ul-Arz
 Zameen pokhin jo ilm ae Hunr
 Keemya-e-Saaat
 Dilaram
 Zeenat novel
 Sao Pan Karo Pano (Auto-Biography)

References 

1853 births
1929 deaths
People from Hyderabad, Sindh
Scholars from Sindh
Sindhi-language writers
Sindhi people
Writers from Sindh